Vatsala Thirumalai is a scientist at Neural Circuits and Development Laboratory, National Centre for Biological  Sciences, Tata Institute of Fundamental Research, Bengaluru. She secured B Tech degree in biotechnology  from Anna University, Chennai and PhD degree in neuroscience from Brandeis University, Waltham, MA. She was a Post-Doctoral Fellow at Cold Spring Harbor Laboratory, Cold Spring Harbor, NY and the National Institutes of Health, Bethesda, MD.

Vatsala Thirumalai was awarded the Shanti Swarup Bhatnagar Prize for Science and Technology in Biological Sciences in the year 2020 for her contributions towards understanding communication and modulation of neuronal function.

Research
The research at Neural Circuits and Development Laboratory which Vatsala Thirumali heads is focused on studying the working of the neural circuits that cause physical movements in animals. The lab has chosen the zebrafish, a fish endemic to the Ganges, for intensive study because of the transparent nature of their body during the embryonic and larval stages. This helps direct visual observation of the interiors.

References

External links

ORCID

Recipients of the Shanti Swarup Bhatnagar Award in Biological Science